This is a complete list of Members of Parliament elected at the 1931 general election, held on 27 October.

Composition
These representative diagrams show the composition of the parties in the 1931 general election. First, immediately after the election.

Second, at the end of 1933, after the Liberal Party withdrew from the National Government.

By-elections
See the list of United Kingdom by-elections.

See also
UK general election, 1931
List of parliaments of the United Kingdom

References
 Whitaker's Almanack for 1934 

1931
1931 United Kingdom general election
 List
UK MPs